Drevsjø Church is a parish church of the Church of Norway in Engerdal Municipality in Innlandet county, Norway. It is located in the village of Drevsjø. It is the church for the Drevsjø parish which is part of the Sør-Østerdal prosti (deanery) in the Diocese of Hamar. The white, wooden church was built in a long church design in 1847 using plans drawn up by an unknown architect. The church seats about 250 people.

History
In the 1840s, increasing populations in the Drevsjø area led to the construction of a new annex chapel in the village. The chapel was consecrated in 1847. Initially, two services were held in the chapel each year. In 1886–1887, the chapel was enlarged by adding a church porch with a tower, choir, and sacristy.

See also
List of churches in Hamar

References

Engerdal
Churches in Innlandet
Long churches in Norway
Wooden churches in Norway
19th-century Church of Norway church buildings
Churches completed in 1847
1847 establishments in Norway